San Jacinto Chilateca is a village in the municipality of Ocotlan de Morelos in the state of Oaxaca, Mexico. It has 641 inhabitants and borders the municipalities of San Martin Tilcajete and Santo Tomás Jalieza.

Etymology 
Chilateca means inhabitants of Chila . chila consists of : name of the place and tecatl : dweller .

References 

Populated places in Oaxaca